The 15045 / 15046 Gorakhpur–Okha Express is an express train of the Indian Railways connecting  in Uttar Pradesh and   in Gujarat. It is currently being operated with 15045/15046 train numbers on a weekly basis.

Coach composition 

The train has standard LHB rakes with max speed of 110 kmph. The train consists of 22 coaches :

 2 AC II Tier
 6 AC III Tier
 7 Sleeper Coaches
 4 General Unreserved
 2 End-on Generator
 1 Pantry Car

Service

15045/ Gorakhpur–Okha Express has an average speed of 49 km/hr and covers 2307 km in 46 hrs 35 mins.

15046/ Okha–Gorakhpur Express has an average speed of 50 km/hr and covers 2307 km in 43 hrs 50 mins.

Route & Halts 

The important halts of the train are :

Schedule

Direction reversal

The train reverses its direction once at;

Traction

Then it is hauled by a Sabarmati-based WDP-4D locomotive for the remainder of the journey until Okha.

See also 

 Gorakhpur Junction railway station
 Okha railway station
 Sabarmati Express

References 
15045/Gorakhpur - Okha Express
15046/Okha - Gorakhpur Express

Passenger trains originating from Gorakhpur
Transport in Okha
Rail transport in Gujarat
Rail transport in Madhya Pradesh
Express trains in India
Railway services introduced in 1989